{{Infobox person
| name = Ada Livitsanou
| native_name        = Άντα Λιβιτσάνου| image =
| caption =
| birth_date = 
| birth_place = Athens, Greece
| death_date =
| death_place =
| othername =
| homepage =
}}
Ada Livitsanou (born July 23, 1979) is a Greek actress and singer. She is best known for her role as Lola in Lola, the Greek edition of the television series Lalola''.

Livitsanou is an actress who has starred in theatrical performances, TV serials and presented fashion shows. She also sings in two indie rock bands, one of them named "VOLT".

On January 30, 2009, Livitsanou appeared as a guest on the season finale of The X Factor (Greece) where she sang "Think".

On January 19, 2010, Alpha TV announced that Livitsanou would be the host of Greek Idol.

Filmography

Television

References

External links

 official blog

1979 births
Living people
Greek television actresses
21st-century Greek women singers
Actresses from Athens
Singers from Athens